Don Diego de Alvarado Huanitzin (or Panitzin) was a 16th-century Nahua noble. A grandson of Axayacatl, Nephew of tlatoani Moctezuma II. He was initially the tlatoani (ruler) of Ecatepec before becoming tlatoani of Tenochtitlan, as well as its first governor under the colonial Spanish system of government.

Biography

Early positions
He was initially the tlatoani (ruler) of Ecatepec before becoming tlatoani of Tenochtitlan, as well as its first governor under the colonial Spanish system of government. He had been designated governor (tlatoani) of Ecatépec  by Moctezuma, in the year 2 Técpatl after the death of Chimalpilli the former tlatoani. Moctezuma was already prisoner of Cortés in Tenochtitlan, the people of Ecatepec accepted him as their ruler and hid him along with his mother.

Captivity and baptism
After the fall of Tenochtitlan, he was one of the five Aztec lords held captive by Cortés along with Cuauhtemoc, the cihuacohuatl Tlacotzin,  Oquiztzin, and Motelchiuhtzin. Along them he was also tortured, with his feet burned, because of the gold lost by the Spaniards when they had to flee Tenochtitlan.

Huanitzin was baptized with the Spanish Christian name Diego, and took the surname de Alvarado from his baptismal sponsor — probably Pedro de Alvarado or one of his brothers, whose uncle with whom they came to America was named Diego de Alvarado.

Governor of Tenochtitlan 
Cortés took Huanitzin along with many other indigenous rulers in his travel to Honduras. He was spared from execution when Cuauhtemoc was hanged by Cortés along with Tetlepanquetzatzin, tlatoani of Tlacopan and don Pedro Cohuanacochtzin. After the return of Cortés, Huanitzin was released and returned as Tlatoani of Ecatepec, where he ruled 14 years.

As grandson of a former Tlatoani, in the year 7 Tochtli (1538), he was chosen as the first governor of Tenochtitlan (Mexico), by the don Antonio de Mendoza, first viceroy of México. Tenochtitlan had been without official ruler for almost a year.

Personal life and death
Don Diego de Alvarado Huanitzin died in 1541. Among his children were Doña Juana de Alvarado, who married Huehue Totoquihuaztli, ruler of Tlacopan; Don Cristóbal de Guzmán Cecetzin, who later became governor of Tenochtitlan; Don Hernando de Alvarado Tezozomoc, an interpreter known today for the Crónica mexicayotl; and Doña Isabel, who married Antonio Valeriano, who would also become governor of Tenochtitlan.

Mass of St. Gregory

Huanitzin may have created a featherwork representation of the Mass of Saint Gregory, after a Dutch engraving. Dated 1539, it is the earliest dated work of art in New Spain.

See also
List of Tenochtitlan rulers

Notes

References

External links

Nahua nobility
Tlatoque of Ecatepec
Tenochca tlatoque
Governors of San Juan Tenochtitlan
Year of birth unknown
1541 deaths
16th-century monarchs in North America
16th-century indigenous people of the Americas
16th-century Mexican people
1520s in the Aztec civilization
16th century in the Aztec civilization
Mexican Roman Catholics
Nobility of the Americas